Pseudagrion cingillum is a species of damselfly in the family Coenagrionidae,
commonly known as a northern riverdamsel. 
It is a medium-sized, blue and black damselfly.
It is found in northern Australia and New Guinea, where it inhabits streams, pools and ponds.

Gallery

See also
 List of Odonata species of Australia

References 

Coenagrionidae
Odonata of Australia
Insects of Australia
Insects of New Guinea
Taxa named by Friedrich Moritz Brauer
Insects described in 1869
Damselflies